The Lac d'Ilay (or Lac de la Motte) is a lake in the Jura department of France. It has a surface area of 0.72 km² (180 acres). It is located in the communes of Le Frasnois and La Chaux-du-Dombief.

Gallery

References

Ilay